Gurita Kaur Football Club (simply known as Gurita Kaur) is an Indonesian football club based in Kaur Regency, Bengkulu. The club competes in the Liga 3 and their homeground is Merdeka Bintuhan Field.

References

External links

Football clubs in Indonesia
 Football clubs in Bengkulu
Association football clubs established in 2021
2021 establishments in Indonesia